Nagui Fam (born 14 November 1961) is an Egyptian-born French TV and radio personality of Egyptian and Italian descent. In his professional life, he goes by his first name Nagui.

Biography 
His television career began in 1987 on M6, and switched to TF1 in 1989.  He became well known at the beginning of the 1990s with his game show Que le meilleur gagne (May the Best One Win) on La Cinq, which he carried over to France 2, which he joined in May 1992.  His fame has been marked by frenetic humour in the part-parody N'oubliez pas votre brosse à dents (Don't Forget Your Toothbrush) or by a much more laid-back tone in the more serious Que le meilleur gagne.

In 1993 he founded his own production house, Air Productions, located at the Plaine Saint-Denis, and created a benchmark music show Taratata where artists perform "live".

In 1999 he attempted to take on the difficult job of succeeding Philippe Gildas and Antoine de Caunes on the Canal+ show, Nulle part ailleurs (Nowhere Else), a role that had already defeated Guillaume Durand.

In 2001 he returned to France 2 to present a game show, Le Numéro Gagnant (Winning Lines), Le Coffre (The Vault) in 2003, then the revival of Intervilles (Intercity) during summer 2004.

As of 2006 he is the host of a daily game show called Tout le monde veut prendre sa place, French for "Everybody wants to take his/her place" (the place being that of the current champion on the show), on France 2. The game concept has been bought by Michael Davies, the Power of 10 producer.

In addition, since December 2007, he hosts a daily musical game show in prime time: N'oubliez pas les paroles!, which is the French version of Don't Forget the Lyrics!
  
On radio, after co-hosting from 07:00 to 10:00 the morning show on Europe 2 (which later became Virgin Radio) with Manu from September 2006 to June 2008, he is currently hosting on Europe 1 a show called Décrochez le Soleil from 09:30 to 11:00. ( Give yourself ...the Sun ).
Currently, he is hosting "La Bande Originale" (The original Sound-track) on France Inter 

In April 2010, a national survey carried out by strategies.fr has placed him as the nation no.1 TV host, which is confirmed by his ratings. He is fluent in English as well as French.

Filmography
 My Wife Is an Actress (2001)

References 

1961 births
Living people
French television presenters
French radio presenters
Egyptian television presenters
Egyptian radio presenters
Egyptian emigrants to France
People from Alexandria
French people of Egyptian descent
French people of Italian descent